Pterocerota is a monotypic moth genus in the family Eupterotidae. Its single species, Pterocerota virginea, has been recorded from KwaZulu-Natal in South Africa. Both the genus and species were described by George Hampson in 1905.

References

Endemic moths of South Africa
Moths described in 1905
Janinae
Monotypic moth genera